Alexander Wylie (Traditional Chinese: 偉烈亞力, Simplified Chinese: 伟烈亚力) (6 April 181510 February 1887), was a British Protestant Christian missionary to China. He is known for his translation work and scholarship during the late Qing Dynasty.

Early life
Wylie was born in London, and went to school at Drumlithie, Kincardineshire, and at Chelsea. While apprenticed to a cabinet-maker, Wylie picked up a Chinese grammar book written in Latin (the Notitia linguae sinicae by Joseph Henri Marie de Prémare).

China
After having mastered Latin, he went on to make such good progress in Chinese that, in 1846, James Legge engaged him to superintend the London Missionary Society's press in Shanghai. In this position, he acquired a wide knowledge of Chinese religion and civilisation, and especially of mathematics, enabling him to demonstrate in his paper Jottings on the Science of the Chinese that Sir George Horner's method (1819) of solving equations of all orders had been known to the Chinese mathematicians of the 14th century.

He made several journeys into the interior, notably in 1858 with Lord Elgin on a British Navy gunboat up the Yangtze and to Nanking, where he served as one member of a delegation of three to meet with officials of the Taiping, and in 1868 with Griffith John to the capital of Szechuen and the source of the Han. He completed the distribution of one million Chinese New Testaments provided by the British and Foreign Bible Society's special fund of 1855. From 1863 he was an agent of the British and Foreign Bible Society. He was succeeded by Samuel Dyer, Junior, the son of Samuel Dyer and brother-in-law of Hudson Taylor.

In Chinese, he translated books on arithmetic, calculus (Loomis), algebra (De Morgan's), mechanics, astronomy (Herschel's), in collaboration with Li Shanlan, and The Marine Steam Engine (TJ Main and T Brown), as well as translations of the Gospel According to Matthew and the Gospel According to Mark. In English his chief works were Jottings on the Science of the Chinese, published in 1853, Shanghai; a collection of articles published under the title Chinese Researches by Alexander Wylie (Shanghai, 1897); Memorials of Protestant Missionaries (1867); Notes on Chinese Literature (Shanghai, 1867). He also published an article on the Nestorian Tablet in Xian.

Retirement

His health and eyesight were failing and he returned to London in 1877. In 1881 and 1882 he sold his collection of some 500 Chinese titles to the Bodleian Library; the collection was catalogued by David Helliwell in 1985. Blind and bed-ridden, he died at his home, 18 Christchurch Road, Hampstead on 6 February 1887 and was buried on the western side of Highgate Cemetery (plot no:15429).

Works

See also
 Protestantism in Sichuan
 List of London Missionary Society missionaries in China

Notes

References 

 Alfred James Broomhall, Hudson Taylor & China's Open Century, Book Six: Assault On The Nine, Hodder and Stoughton and Overseas Missionary Fellowship, 1988
 Henri Cordier, The Life and Labours of Alexander Wylie, London: Trubner & Co, 1887
 David Helliwell, A catalogue of the old Chinese books in the Bodleian Library, Oxford: The Bodleian Library, 1985

External links

1815 births
1887 deaths
British sinologists
English Protestant missionaries
Protestant missionaries in Sichuan
Protestant missionaries in China
British expatriates in China
Translators of the Bible into Chinese
Christian writers
Burials at Highgate Cemetery
19th-century translators
Missionary linguists